Sacerdote is an Italian surname. Notable people with the surname include:

Ana Sacerdote (born 1925), Argentine Jewish abstract artist
Anselmo Sacerdote (1868–1926), Italian Jewish painter, engraver and photographer
Bruce Sacerdote (graduated 1990), American economist
David Sacerdote (1550–1625), Italian Jewish composer and banker
Donato Sacerdote (1820–1883), Italian Jewish poet 
Eugenia Sacerdote de Lustig (1910 – 2011), Italian-born Argentine physician
Jenny Sacerdote (1868–1962), French couturier

See also 

 Sacerdote (disambiguation)

Italian-language surnames